Trevor Raymond Sprigg (10 August 1946 – 17 January 2008) was an Australian politician and legislator from Western Australia, as well as a former football star. Sprigg, a member of the Liberal Party, was the Liberal Party legislative whip as well as the member for the electorate of Murdoch in the Western Australian Legislative Assembly.

Sprigg was elected to his seat in the Western Australian general election in 2005.

Personal life
Sprigg was born in Wagin, Western Australian in 1946 and was widely known as a sports enthusiast and athlete. He was a lifetime member of the East Fremantle Football Club and played a total of 152 League games for the club. Sprigg also worked at various other football clubs as a coach, chairman of selectors, captain and football manager. For example, he worked for the West Coast Eagles Football Club from 1990 to 1992. Sprigg also worked as a consultant to the Western Australian Football Commission during the planning and formation of the Fremantle Football Club.

Additionally, Sprigg worked for the Australian Broadcasting Corporation, as well as several radio stations and newspapers, as a part-time columnist and football commentator. He was awarded an Australian Sports Medal in 2000.

Sprigg was married and had five children (Sharon, Natalie, Jarrod, Travis and Brett) and seven grandchildren.

Death
Trevor Sprigg died from a heart attack at Fremantle Hospital in Perth on 17 January 2008 at the age of 61.

His heart attack and subsequent death prevented him from attending a partyroom meeting that day which saw Troy Buswell replace Paul Omodei as Liberal leader.

References

External links
Trevor Sprigg's MP page
The Australian: Leader breaks down after shock death
Sunday Times: Murdoch MLA Trevor Sprigg dead at 61
ABC News: East Fremantle mourns loss of MP Sprigg

1946 births
2008 deaths
People from Fremantle
Liberal Party of Australia members of the Parliament of Western Australia
East Fremantle Football Club players
William Leitch Medal winners
Glenorchy Football Club players
Glenorchy Football Club coaches
Australian rules football commentators
Australian sportsperson-politicians
Members of the Western Australian Legislative Assembly
Australian rules footballers from Western Australia
People from Wagin, Western Australia
East Fremantle Football Club administrators
West Coast Eagles administrators
20th-century Australian politicians
21st-century Australian politicians